The Enchanted Forest was a fairy tale-themed amusement park that opened in 1971 in Hope Valley, Hopkinton, Rhode Island. Throughout its lifetime, it was mainly oriented to younger children and families. The park contained rides such as a child-sized roller coaster, bumper cars, and a merry go round, as well as having a live petting zoo and a miniature golf course. It occupied about 20 acres. The Enchanted Forest was closed in 2005. due to low money flow. The rides were sold through an auction.

See also
Rocky Point Amusement Park

References

Defunct amusement parks in the United States
Amusement parks in Rhode Island
Rhode Island culture